The International Merchant Marine Registry of Belize (IMMARBE) is the body appointed by the Government of Belize to register ships under the Belizean flag.

References

External links
International Merchant Marine Registry of Belize Official Website.

Water transport in Belize
Economy of Belize
Ship registration